Stanislav Petrov (born 14 August 1979) is a Bulgarian footballer, who plays as a defender.

References

1979 births
Living people
Bulgarian footballers
First Professional Football League (Bulgaria) players
PFC Dobrudzha Dobrich players
PFC Spartak Varna players

Association football defenders